I. Gopalakrishnan (15 October 1915 – 7 August 1981) was an Indian cricket umpire. He stood in seven Test matches between 1961 and 1969.

See also
 List of Test cricket umpires

References

1915 births
1981 deaths
Place of birth missing
Indian Test cricket umpires